Girard Brown Henderson (February 25, 1905 – November 16, 1983) was an American business executive and philanthropist. He is best known as a director of Avon Products and the founder of the Alexander Dawson Schools.

Early life
Girard Henderson (Jerry) was born on February 25, 1905, in Brooklyn, New York. He was the son of Alexander D. Henderson and Ella M. Brown. He was the grandson of Joseph Henderson (pilot) and brother to Alexander D. Henderson, Jr. In 1910, the family moved from Brooklyn to Suffern, New York. Henderson went to the Suffern Grammar School and later the Sisters of the Holy Child Jesus. He continued his education at the preparatory Storm King School in Cornwall On Hudson, New York. He graduated in the class of 1923. In 1925, Henderson was accepted to Dartmouth College, but only attended his freshman year.

On February 28, 1927, Henderson married Theodora Gregson Huntington (1904–1979) from Spring Valley, New York, which was located five miles north of Suffern. They had two children. Henderson and Huntington divorced in 1960.  In 1928, Henderson took a job with a stock brokerage firm in Paterson, New Jersey. When the stock market crashed in 1929, he worked selling life insurance for the Phoenix Mutual Insurance Company.

On June 5, 1964, Henderson married his second wife, Mary Hollingsworth (1905–1988) in Clark County, Nevada.

Career

In the 1930s, Henderson flew a Beechcraft Model 17 Staggerwing airplane for David H. McConnell, president of the California Perfume Company. The company chartered his plane to transport executives going from Philadelphia and Albany on business. In 1933, Henderson opened the Henderson Motor Co., a Chrysler Dodge dealership in Suffern, New York with Kenneth Burnham. Henderson later landed a contract to truck materials for Avon from New York City to Suffern.

In 1940, Henderson was elected to serve on the Board of Directors for Avon Products. He was on the board for 35 years.

In 1950, Henderson created the Alarm Corporation in Carmel, California. The company provided underground cable service to Monterey Peninsula communities. The company had its receiving antenna site on the high ground of Pebble Beach.

Henderson owned a majority stake in a company called, Underground world Homes. In 1964, Henderson sponsored the Underground World Home exhibit at the New York World's Fair. In addition to the underground home, there was also an exhibit sponsored by Henderson called: "Why Live Underground?"
 At the height of the Cold War and fearing nuclear war or other catastrophe, Henderson built and lived in underground homes in Colorado and Las Vegas, Nevada. Architect Jay Swayze designed and built a  underground home for Henderson in Las Vegas. The home had a swimming pool, a hot tub, and a generator. In 1996 the home was put up for sale for 8 million dollars.

Alexander Dawson Foundation 

In 1960, Henderson created the Alexander Dawson Foundation, a nonprofit organization dedicated to education.

In 1980, Henderson created the Colorado Junior Republic School (CJR) on a 380 acre site near Lafayette, Colorado, as a boarding school for children who otherwise wouldn't have an opportunity for an education. Today, the school is called the Alexander Dawson School (ADS) and is operated under the Alexander Dawson Foundation. The school is a coeducational college preparatory day school for grades K-12.

Aviation 
On September 1, 1978, Henderson invested in and was on the board of directors for Gulfstream American Corporation, a company formed by Allen Paulson, which acquired the Grumman American Aviation Corporation for $32 million and $20.5 million in preferred stock. The company, was a subsidiary of the Grumman Aerospace Corporation, that manufactured and sold the Gulfstream II executive aircraft. Gulfstream American also manufactured the Gulfstream American Hustler.

In 1964, Henderson got involved in the Blue Channel Seafood Company that was located in Port Royal, South Carolina due west of Lady's Island. He acquired full ownership in 1968 from Sterling Harris, the founder and president. The company did a lot of direct mail advertising of their products, which included Clam Chowder, She-Crab Soup, Oyster Stew, Crabmeat, etc.

Henderson created the Dawson Yacht Corporation in Las Vegas, Nevada, as a subsidiary of Alexander Dawson, Inc. The company sold about 300 Dawson 26 boats. In the "Story of the Windship 'Prodigal', Bob Lengyel talks about a three-week journey on a Dawson 26. Henderson converted an "Air-Sea Rescue Craft," built in 1946 for the Army Air Force, into a luxurious yacht called the Roosterfish.

Cecil Peak Station

In 1975, Henderson purchased the Cecil Peak Station, near Queenstown, New Zealand on the western shore of Lake Wakatipu, from Fred "Popeye" Lucas. The Cecil Peak station became a tourist attraction. Henderson sold the property in 1986.

Storm King School 
Henderson attended the Storm King School from 1916–1923, graduating in the class of 1923. He later gave gifts for school buildings and educational programs. In 1981, Henderson provided a significant grant that launched the Henderson Outdoor Recreation Program at the Storm King School in New York.

Death
On November 16, 1983, Henderson died at his underground home in Las Vegas, Nevada. Henderson's body was flown to Beaufort, South Carolina. His funeral was on November 18 at the Laurel Hill Plantation at Sam's Point Road on Lady's Island (South Carolina). He was buried inside Laura Hill Chapel on a one-acre site with a street leading to it named "Henderson Way."

References

External links

Mary's Family Connections by Mary Anthony Lathrop (1979)
Video tour of Girard B. Henderson's Jay Swayze designed underground home

1905 births
1983 deaths
People from Brooklyn
People from Suffern, New York
20th-century American businesspeople
People associated with direct selling